Serapias orientalis is a species of orchids occurring from the east-central and eastern Mediterranean to the western Transcaucasus.

Subspecies
Serapias orientalis subsp. apulica H.Baumann & Künkele, 1989
Serapias orientalis subsp. carica H. Baumann & Künkele, 1989
Serapias orientalis subsp. levantina (H. Baumann & Künkele) Kreutz, 2004
Serapias orientalis subsp. orientalis
Serapias orientalis subsp. siciliensis Bartolo & Pulv., 1993

References

External links 

orientalis
Flora of Lebanon
Plants described in 1972